Aero Pictorial Ltd was a British aerial photography company in operation between 1934–39 and then 1946-60.  It was founded by Aerofilms photographer Cyril Murrell (1899–1958), and run more or less as a one-man band.  In his later years, Murrell flew from Elstree Aerodrome in Hertfordshire.

Pre-war photos were taken on  glass plates, whilst post-war, similar sized roll film was used.  This large negative format meant the majority of photos were very sharp and detailed.

After Murrell's death in 1958, the company was merged with Aerofilms and ceased operating in 1960.  The Aerofilms archive was sold in 2007 to English Heritage and as a result, copyright on Aero Pictorial's photography rests with them.

The 2008 publication British Seaside Piers, by Chris Mawson (former Librarian at Aerofilms) & Richard Riding (editor of Aeroplane magazine from 1973-98), was dedicated to Murrell as the book features a large number of aerial shots of piers drawn from the Aero Pictorial archive.

Aerial photography